Lanark is a town in South Lanarkshire, Scotland, located 20 kilometres to the south-east of Hamilton. The town lies on the River Clyde, at its confluence with Mouse Water. In 2016, the town had a population of 9,050.

Lanark has been a royal burgh since 1140, and was historically the county town of Lanarkshire, though in modern times this title belongs to Hamilton. Notable landmarks nearby include New Lanark, the Corra Linn and the site of Lanark Castle.

Lanark railway station and coach station have frequent services to Glasgow. There is little industry in Lanark and some residents commute to work in Glasgow and Edinburgh. Its shops serve the local agricultural community and surrounding villages. There is a large modern livestock auction market on the outskirts of the town.

History 

The town's name is believed to come from the Cumbric  meaning "clear space, glade".

Lanark has served as an important market town since medieval times, and King David I made it a royal burgh in 1140, giving it certain mercantile privileges relating to government and taxation. David I realised that greater prosperity could result from encouraging trade. He decided to create a chain of new towns across Scotland. These would be centres of Norman civilisation in a largely Celtic country, and would be established in such a way as to encourage the development of trade within their area. These new towns were to be known as Burghs. Bastides were established in France for much the same reason.

When a site had been selected for a new town the King's surveyors would lay out an area for the town's market. Each merchant who came to the town was granted a plot of land (usually rent free for the first few years) bordering on the marketplace. These plots were known as feus or in royal burghs such as Lanark as burgages. Each burgage in a burgh was the same size, though the size varied between burghs. The layout of the burgages in Lanark can still be easily seen between the north side of Lanark High Street (the former market place) and North Vennel, a lane which runs behind the burgages. A motte and bailey castle was also constructed at the bottom of Castlegate.

Lanark had four town gates, West Port, East port, Wellgate and Castlegate. West Port gate was demolished in the 1770s.

The first aviation meeting to be held in Scotland was held at Lanark Racecourse between 6 and 13 August 1910. This location was chosen because the land was relatively flat, the racecourse already had facilities for a paying public, there were stables to act as hangars for the aeroplanes and the racecourse was accessible by both road and by rail, especially as The Caledonian Railway Company were prepared to construct a new station near the main entrance. The aeroplanes were transported to the meeting by rail, as aviation technology at the time was not advanced enough to safely fly there. The Lanark meeting took place shortly after a similar event in Bournemouth at which Charles Rolls died. The meeting was described by The Aero magazine as 'the most successful yet held in Britain'.

A permanent military presence was established in the town with the completion of Winston Barracks in the 1930s.

Governance 

The citizens of Lanark form part of various different constituencies. In local elections, they are the main component of the Clydesdale North ward which elects three representatives to South Lanarkshire Council. In elections to the Scottish Parliament, Lanark elects its representatives as part of the Clydesdale constituency, and also contributes to the election of seven additional list members as part of the South of Scotland region. The current Clydesdale MSP is Aileen Campbell of the SNP, who defeated the Labour incumbent Karen Gillon in the 2011 election after Gillon had held the seat since 1999. In Westminster elections, Lanark is part of the Lanark and Hamilton East constituency. Labour's Jimmy Hood represented the area in Parliament from 1987 until 2015; since then the MP has been Angela Crawley. Prior to Brexit in 2020, the town was part of the Scotland constituency which elected six MEPs to the European Parliament.

Landmarks 

There are 14 historical closes or vennels in the town - alleyways allowing access to the High street. Some are named after an original shop owner, one is named Wallace close as it depicts key moments of William Wallace's life in Lanark 

Visitors to the town can visit the nearby World Heritage Site of New Lanark, close to the Falls of Clyde, the Corehouse estate and the Scottish Wildlife Trust's Corehouse Nature Reserve.

The Lanark Museum is located in West Port, inside the YMCA building.

A large boating lake, Lanark Loch, adjoins Lanark Golf Club which has a lovely and historic 18 hole course for more experienced golf players and a 9-hole golf course. The former racecourse now offers pony-trekking activities.

The town's Castlebank Park lies near the former site of Lanark Castle, and allows access to the River Clyde and the Clyde Walkway.

An ornate gas lamp, known as the provost's lamp stands at the bottom of the High Street. After the burgh council was abolished in 1975, the provost's lamp, which had historically been placed outside the house of the provost as one of their marks of office, was relocated to the pavement just to the east of Lanark Tolbooth on a permanent basis.

One of the churches in the town bears the name of The Old Church of St Kentigern (perhaps better known as St Mungo), who set up many medieval churches in the Scottish Lowlands, including Glasgow, and died c.612 AD. The town's cemetery stands on the site of The Old Church of St Kentigern, and includes many Covenanter graves.

St. Nicholas Parish Church stands at the bottom of the high street. The church bell is believed to date from 1110, and may be one of the oldest church bells in the world. It was moved from The Old Church of St Kentigern when St. Nicholas Church was built in 1774. It has been recast four times, including 1659 and 1983. There is an 8-foot (2.45 m) statue of William Wallace in the steeple. This was sculpted by Robert Forrest, from an ancient drawing in the possession of the Society of Antiquaries.

Lanimers 

This historic background forms the basis for the Lanark Lanimers gala day, which take place each year for one week in June. Local primary schoolchildren elect a Lanimers queen and court; and a Lord Cornet is chosen from local businessmen. On the Monday night the Perambulation of the Marches takes place, when townspeople turn out to walk around half the town boundary, following the Lord Cornets past and present as they inspect the border-stones. Traditionally, the townspeople carry "birks" (Scots for "sticks of birch"), which are small branches of birch trees cut from the woods at the Glenburnie estate. This tradition was started in 1948 by Joseph Doolan, whose family owned the land. The other half of the boundary is inspected on the Wednesday night, again led by the Lord Cornet accompanied by many local riders who participate in the Riding of the Marches, locally referred to as the Rideout. On the Thursday morning, schools and other organisations parade before the Lanimer Queen in themed dress, accompanied by pipe bands. The best Lanimer Lorries win prizes, and after the parade the crowning of the Queen takes place on a temporary stand erected in front of St Nicholas' Church, under the statue of William Wallace. The Queen holds a reception party in the town's Memorial Hall on the Friday night, where children perform songs and dances.

Music 
Pipe Bands: Lanark & District Pipe Band previously had two units which competed in competitions run by the Royal Scottish Pipe Band Association - one competing in Grade 4B and one in Grade 3A, having been upgraded from 4B to 4A to 3B to 3A in consecutive years from 2004.  In the 1980s, the band competed as high as Grade 2. At the end of the 2015 season, the band won the RSPBA Champion of Champions in Grade 4B and was promoted to Grade 4A. This was followed by promotion from Grade 4A at the end of the 2016 season. As of 2017, the band competes in Grade 3B.

The 'Music in Lanark' programme began in 2000 with the aim of bringing a variety of the highest quality live music to the town. In the first five years there were three classical concerts, one jazz concert and one traditional (Scottish) music concert.  The programme continues to grow.

Climate

As with the rest of the British Isles and Scotland, Lanark experiences a maritime climate with cool summers and mild winters. In terms of the local climate profile, Lanark's inland, rural setting means frost is common, although there is considerable variation within the area. The town itself sits on a hilltop above the River Clyde, so katabatic drainage means that the incidence of frost will be less.

Notable Lanarkians 

William Wallace is one of the most notable people in Lanark's history. A key leader in the Scottish Wars of Independence, he is known to have first "drawn his sword to free his native land" in Lanark in 1297, killing the English sheriff Haselrig. First year pupils at Lanark Grammar School study Wallace and the Wars of Independence in detail. An 8-foot statue of Wallace sits on St Nicholas Church at the town cross dating back to 1817 which was sculpted by Carluke man Robert Forrest.

Other important figures in Lanark history include:
 Margaret Agnes Bunn, actress (1799–1883)
 William Smellie (1697–1763), obstetrician
 Lord Braxfield (1722–1799), High Court Judge
 John Glaister (1856–1932), forensic scientist
 The rallying family of Jimmy, Alister and Colin McRae
 Robert (Rab) Douglas, Scotland and former Celtic F.C. goalkeeper,
 Stephen McManus, Scotland and Middlesbrough defender 
 Walter Smith, Scotland and Rangers manager 
 Henry Smith, Scotland and Hearts goalkeeper 
 Billy Ritchie Rock music's first lead keyboard player, born in Lanark
 Lee Miller, Carlisle United striker
 Dougie Imrie, St Mirren midfielder, started career with Lanark United
 Stephen Pearson, Derby County midfielder, formerly of Motherwell
 Johnny Reid, a Scottish/Canadian country music singer, who has two platinum albums and one gold album in Canada
 Darren Smith, former Motherwell winger
 Stewart Greacen (born 1988), footballer on Rangers F.C.
 John Downie,  (1925–2013) Inside forward for Manchester United 1949–1953
 Chic McSherry OBE, the entrepreneur, musician and author was born in Lanark
Andrew Sharkey, Chief Commissioner of Scouts Scotland and previous Camp Chief of the Blair Atholl International Scout Jamborette

Schools

Primary schools 
There are three main primary schools in Lanark:
Lanark Primary School (LPS) 1
Robert Owen Memorial Primary School (ROMPS) 1
St. Mary's Primary School 2
1 Indicates non-denominational school
2 Roman Catholic school

Secondary schools 
There is now one secondary school in Lanark:
Lanark Grammar School (LGS), a non-denominational school. A papal bull founded a school in Lanark in 1183. There has been continuous provision of schooling in Lanark since that date. Lanark Grammar School has been considered the successor school, being the only secondary school in the town.

Religion
The religious buildings of Lanark are exclusively Christian, but cover a wide array of Christian denominations. At present, the following religious buildings still exist and remain in use:

Christ Church
EU Congregational Church
Gospel Hall
Greyfriars Parish Church
Kingdom Hall of Jehovah's Witnesses
St Mary's Roman Catholic Church
St Nicholas Parish Church
The following buildings remain in Lanark, but are no longer used for religious purposes:

Murray Chapel - in a state of disrepair, this church is within the council's St Catherine cemetery.
St Kentigern's Church (Hope Street) - converted to and now used as office space and residences.
St Kentigern's Church (Hyndford Road) - now in ruins, this church sits in the council-run St Kentigern's cemetery.

Finally, these buildings no longer exist:

St Leonard's Church - space now occupied by Job Centre Plus Office.

Gallery

See also 
 Lanark (Parliament of Scotland constituency)
 The Lanark Silver Bell, a horseracing trophy
 Lanark County in Ontario, Canada
 Lanark, Ontario, a village in Lanark County
 Lanark Grammar School
 Bonnington Pavilion, a nearby historic feature.
 Whuppity Scoorie Day
 Lanark Lanimers

References 

 Historical Tours in the Clyde Valley. Published by the Clyde Valley Tourist Association and the Lanark & District Archaeological Association. Printed by Robert MacLehose and Company Limited, Renfrew, Scotland. 1982.
 Building the Royal Burghs by John Barrett and David Iredale. Published in The Scots Magazine. Volume 142, Number 1. January 1995. pp. 10–22.
 Upper Clydesdale: A History and Guide by Daniel Martin. Published by the Tuckwell Press, Phantassie, East Linton. 1999.
 Clydesdale District Guide. Published by Clydesdale District Guide. 1995.
 Lanark Heritage Trail. Published by South Lanarkshire Council. 2001.

External links 

 

 
Towns in South Lanarkshire
County towns in Scotland
Royal burghs